The visa policy of Somalia dictates the use and acquisition of visas in Somalia. In accordance with the law, citizens of all countries require a visa to visit Somalia.

Visa on arrival

Holders of passports issued by any country can obtain a visa on arrival valid for 30 days at the following airports:

Bosaso Airport in Bosaso
Garowe Airport in Garowe
Abdullahi Yusuf Airport in Galkayo
Aden Adde International Airport in Mogadishu
Kismayo Airport in Kismayo

See also

 Visa requirements for Somali citizens
 Visa policy of Somaliland

References

Somalia
Foreign relations of Somalia